Cucurbita argyrosperma, also called the cushaw squash and silver-seed gourd, is a species of winter squash originally from the south of Mexico. This annual herbaceous plant is cultivated in the Americas for its nutritional value: its flowers, shoots, and fruits are all harvested, but it is cultivated most of all for its seeds, which are used for sauces. It was formerly known as Cucurbita mixta.

It is a Cucurbita species, with varieties that are commonly cultivated in the United States as part of the Eastern Agricultural Complex and Mexico south to Nicaragua. Of all the cultivated Cucurbita species it is the least found outside the Americas. It originated in Mesoamerica, most likely in the state of Jalisco, from its wild sororia form. The reference genome of this species was published in 2019.

Description
The flowers are orange or yellow and bloom in July or August. The plant grows about 1 foot high and spreads 10–15 feet. It likes well drained soil and has both male and female flowers. Fruits can weigh up to 20 pounds. The published results of an interspecific hybridization experiment in 1990 noted that as of that time Cucurbita argyrosperma was often grown in close proximity to Cucurbita moschata in Guatemala and Mexico.

Systematics
Cucurbita argyrosperma is classified into two subspecies: C. argyrosperma subsp. argyrosperma and C. argyrosperma subsp. sororia. C. argyrosperma subsp. sororia is believed to be the wild ancestor of the other forms.

C. argyrosperma subsp. argyrosperma is further subdivided into C. argyrosperma subsp. argyrosperma var. argyrosperma , C. argyrosperma subsp. argyrosperma var. callicarpa, C. argyrosperma subsp. argyrosperma var. palmieri, and C. argyrosperma subsp. argyrosperma var. stenosperma.

Subspecies Argyrosperma var. Palmieri 
Cucurbita argyrosperma subsp. argyrosperma var. palmeri was formerly considered a separate species within Cucurbita. It is found from the Pacific coast of northwestern Mexico to Nicaragua. It was originally formally described by Liberty Hyde Bailey in 1943, in Gentes Herbarum.

Subspecies Sororia 
Cucurbita argyrosperma subsp. sororia was at one time considered a separate species within Cucurbita. It ranges from northern Mexico to Nicaragua, mostly along the Pacific coast. This species was also considered at one time to be closely related to Cucurbita texana with which it hybridizes well. It was originally described formally described by Liberty Hyde Bailey in 1943, in Gentes Herbarum. In 1948, Cucurbita kellyana was described as an independent species, but this taxa is now considered a synonym for sororia.

Cultivars
Variety is used here interchangeably with cultivar, but not with species or taxonomic variety.
 Campeche squash - Cultivated for seed rather than flesh
 Green-Striped cushaw or Green Crookneck
 Japanese pie pumpkin
 Jonathan pumpkin or White crookneck pumpkin - Available commercially as early as 1891 by Livingston Seed
 Orange-Striped cushaw, orange-striped cushaw squash, cushaw pumpkin'Uses
Food
The flowers, stems, shoots, and unripe fruits of the plant are consumed as vegetables. In the south of Mexico, the wild, more bitter varieties are used in this same way, once washed and cleaned to eliminate cucurbitin. The ripe fruit is grilled to make pies or used to feed animals. The seeds yield an edible oil.

It is also grown in the Sonoran Desert region of the  Southwestern United States and Northwestern Mexico by native peoples, especially the Tohono O'odham, where it is especially prized when immature as a summer squash.

Medicinal propertiesCucurbita argyrosperma also has medicinal properties. A liquid emulsion of its seed can act as a vermifuge, and the subsequent use of a laxative can effect an expulsion of parasitic worms.

The Yucatán peasantry has traditionally used the flesh of Cucurbita argyrosperma'' to tend burns, sores, and eczema, while the seeds have been used with the aim of promoting lactation in nursing women, and provide pain relief.

References

External links

argyrosperma
Squashes and pumpkins
Flora of the Southwestern United States
Flora of Northwestern Mexico
Flora of Nicaragua
Crops originating from Pre-Columbian North America